Jan Hordijk (born 5 February 1950) is a Dutch former professional tennis player.

Born in Rotterdam, Hordijk featured in nine Davis Cup ties for the Netherlands, from 1969 to 1974. His Davis Cup career included a singles win over Paolo Bertolucci of Italy and doubles win against a Romanian duo featuring Ilie Năstase.

Hordijk, a two-time national champion in singles, reached a career high ranking of No. 152 in the world, with main draw appearances at the Australian Open and Wimbledon.

See also
List of Netherlands Davis Cup team representatives

References

External links
 
 
 

1950 births
Living people
Dutch male tennis players
Sportspeople from Rotterdam
20th-century Dutch people